Hewer is a surname. Notable people with the surname include:

John Hewer (1922–2008), English actor
Mitch Hewer (born 1989), English actor
Nick Hewer (born 1944), former public relations officer, Alan Sugar's advisor on The Apprentice
Reginald Hewer (1892–1970), British cavalry officer
William Hewer (1642–1715), British politician